Patryk Chojnowski (born 5 April 1990) is a para table tennis player who competes for Poland. He is currently world number one in his sports class category. He is a Paralympic champion, four-time World champion and eight-time European champion.

See also
Natalia Partyka

References

1990 births
Living people
Sportspeople from Gdańsk
Paralympic table tennis players of Poland
Table tennis players at the 2012 Summer Paralympics
Table tennis players at the 2016 Summer Paralympics
Medalists at the 2012 Summer Paralympics
Medalists at the 2016 Summer Paralympics
Paralympic gold medalists for Poland
Paralympic silver medalists for Poland
Paralympic bronze medalists for Poland
People from Świdnik
Paralympic medalists in table tennis
Table tennis players at the 2020 Summer Paralympics
Polish male table tennis players
20th-century Polish people
21st-century Polish people